Yuvaraja is a 2001 Indian Kannada-language sports drama film directed by Puri Jagannadh and produced by R. Srinivas. The film stars Shiva Rajkumar, Bhavna Pani and Lisa Ray. The film is the remake of 1999 Telugu film Thammudu which was based on the 1979 American film Breaking Away. The film was released on 2 November 2001 across  cinema halls in Karnataka. The film finished a 50 day theatrical run.

Plot
Raju alias Yuvaraja  is the youngest son of a family and a careless guy, always going around girls and enjoying with them. His womanizing habits are a source of heartburn for his father. However, his elder brother Chakri is a kickboxer and his father's favourite son, who is very fond of him. Janu, Yuvaraja's neighbour, is in love with him, but it is just one sided as Raju considers her a good friend and a source of money and cars to impress girls (Janu's father is a garage owner).

Raju starts going out with Lovely, a rich college girl, and poses as a wealthy millionaire's son to impress her and love her. Lovely falls for his lies and starts loving him. However, she soon finds out that Raju has lied to her and dumps him and insults him in front of his father. Raju's father, tired of his son's antics, kicks him out of the house and shuns him. Raju is now homeless and Jaanu tells him to be more responsible of himself. Later, Chakri is attacked by Rohith, who happens to be Lovely's new boyfriend and his enemy, and his friends and is bedridden, unable to take part in the kickboxing championship. Raju decides to fight for his brother and to redeem himself in his father's eyes by fighting in the championship match against Rohith. Deciding to seek revenge for his brother's accident and to prove himself to his father, Yuvaraja defeats Rohith after a long and bloody boxing match, redeems himself in front of his father's eyes and finally accepts Janu's love. Hence the film ends with a happy ending, and everyone greets Raju as Yuvaraja.

Cast
 Shiva Rajkumar as Raj alias Yuvaraja Rathnam 
 Lisa Ray as Lovely
 Bhavna Pani as Janaki alias Jaanu
 Kumar Govind as Chakri, Raju's brother
 Srinath as Vishwanath, Raju's father
 Avinash as Vetri and Raju's coach
 Sharan as kitti, Raj's friend
 Ramesh Bhat as Jaanu's Father
 Balaraj as Sakshi Shivanand, Raju's Friend
 Bullet Prakash as Raju's Friend
 Dharma as Rohith
 Sanketh Kashi
 M.S.Umesh
 Mandeep Roy
 Badri Narayan 
 Sridhar Raj 
 Niranjan Shetty
 Appu Venkatesh 
 Rajeev Rathod 
 Rocket vikram

Soundtrack
The music of the film was composed by Ramana Gogula and lyrics were written by K. Kalyan.

References

External links
 2001 Year Roundup

2001 films
2000s Kannada-language films
2000s sports drama films
Indian action drama films
Kannada remakes of Telugu films
Indian sports drama films
Indian boxing films
Films directed by Puri Jagannadh
2001 action drama films